The Morning Leader is a Sri Lankan English-language newspaper. It is published by Leader Publications (Pvt) Ltd. Its sister publications are The Sunday Leader and Iruresa. The Morning Leader was refounded by Lasantha Wickramatunge who was assassinated in January 2009. It is known for its independent news coverage and it has faced arson attacks from men with complicity from the Sri Lankan authorities.

References

External links
Continuing trend” towards stifling free media
The Morning Leader Website
Morning Leader

Defunct newspapers published in Sri Lanka
English-language newspapers published in Sri Lanka
Leader Publications